Wally Taylor (July 14, 1930 – October 7, 2012) was an American actor known for Rocky III (1982), Escape from New York (1981) and The Golden Child (1986). He also starred in the Arena Stage production of Before It Hits Home.

Filmography

References

External links

1930 births
2012 deaths
African-American male actors
American male film actors
American male television actors
People from Maywood, Illinois
20th-century African-American people
21st-century African-American people